The 2nd Asia Pacific Screen Awards were held in  2008.

Winners and nominees
Winners are listed first and in bold.

Best Feature Film
Tulpan
Om Shanti Om
Sparrow
The Red Awn
Three Monkeys

Best Youth Feature Film
The Black Balloon
King Siri
Mahek
Philippine Science

Best Animated Feature Film
Waltz With Bashir
If You Were Me: Anima Vision 2
Sword of the Stranger

Best Documentary Feature Film
63 Years On
Kantata Takwa
Tinar
Rain of the Children
33 Days

Achievement in Cinematography
Lee Mogae (The Good, the Bad, the Weird)
Kiiran Deohans (Jodhaa Akbar)
Gökhan Tiryaki (Three Monkeys)
Oleg Kirichenko (Mermaid)
Cheng Siu-Keung (Sparrow)

Achievement in Directing
Nuri Bilge Ceylan (Three Monkeys)
Sergey Dvortsevoy (Tulpan)
Kim Jee-Woon (The Good, the Bad, the Weird)
Kiyoshi Kurosawa (Tokyo Sonata)
Johnnie To (Sparrow)

Best Screenplay
Eran Riklis and Suha Arraf (Lemon Tree)
Behnam Behzadi (Before the Burial)
Hong Sangsoo (Night and Day)
Max Mannix, Kiyoshi Kurosawa and Sachiko Tanaka (Tokyo Sonata)
Dervish Zaim (Dot)

Best Performance by an Actress
Hiam Abbass (Lemon Tree)
Nesipkul Omarbekova (Native Dancer)
Miao Pu (Cherries)
Daria Moroz (Live and Remember)
Akie Namiki (United Red Army)

Best Performance by an Actor
Reza Naji (The Song of Sparrows)
Rajat Kapoor (The Prisoner)
Simon Yam (Sparrow)
Kim Yoon-seok (The Chaser)
Alireza Aghakhani (Before the Burial)

FIAPF Award
Yash Chopra

UNESCO Award
Tinar

Jury Grand Prize
The Prisoner
The Red Awn

References

Asia Pacific Screen Awards
Asia Pacific Screen Awards